Vallejo High School is a high school located in Vallejo, California. It is part of the Vallejo City Unified School District and has been in the heart of Vallejo for more than 100 years. It currently serves the west side of the city (west of Interstate 80).

In February 2014, the School's mascot was changed from the Apaches to Redhawks. This was due to the controversy revolving around the use of the name of a Native American tribe as a mascot.

Academies

Referred to as the "Wall-to-Wall Academies", each academy is a unique, small learning community. As freshman, students are automatically placed into the 9th Grade Academy with classes located on the former Vallejo Middle School Campus. In tenth grade, students choose an academy to remain in based on individual college/career interests. Several of these academies features Career and Technical Education (CTE) courses.  Beginning with the class of 2016, all students are required to be in an academy.

Biotechnology Academy

Green Engineering Academy and Robotics

Health and Fitness Academy
Hospitality Academy
Visual and Performing Arts Academy

Notable alumni
Brandon Armstrong,  former professional basketball player
Dick Bass, former football running back who played for the Los Angeles Rams from 1960 to 1969
Norm Bass, former college and professional football player
Greg Blankenship, former NFL player for the Oakland Raiders and Pittsburgh Steelers
Vic Bottari, football player
Raymond Burr, actor  
Joey Chestnut, competitive eater
Bill Corbus, football guard
Rockmond Dunbar, actor
E-40, Musician
Pete Escovedo, Mexican-American musician percussionist
David Estrada, robotics and autonomous vehicle lawyer
Augie Garrido, head coach in NCAA Division I college baseball
Tonee Hayes, rapper known as Nef the Pharaoh
Damon Hollins, former Major League Baseball outfielder
Mike Merriweather, former Pittsburgh Steelers and Minnesota Vikings 3x Pro Bowl linebacker
Mark Muñoz, 2x California state champion wrestler; 2x NCAA D-1 All-American at OSU; professional mixed martial artist fighter who competed in the UFC
DeMarcus Nelson, professional basketball player
Bob Parlocha, jazz expert who is best known as a radio host and programmer
Rashad Ross, National Football League wide receiver
CC Sabathia, Major League Baseball pitcher with New York Yankees
Sly Stone,  musician with Sly & the Family Stone
Joe Thurston,  professional baseball utility player for Leones de Yucatán of Mexican League
Rob Wainwright, professional basketball player

1999 CIF Track and Field Champions
Paced by State Championships in the 400 Meter Relay and the 300 Meter Hurdles, Vallejo High School won the CIF Track and Field Championships. Rico Hatter won the 300 Meter Hurdles and finished 3rd in the 110 High Hurdles. Vallejo also finished 2nd in the 1600 Meter Relay.

References

External links

High schools in Solano County, California
Public high schools in California
Schools in Vallejo, California
1869 establishments in California
Educational institutions established in 1869